The National Probate Calendar is a register of proved wills and administrations in England and Wales since 1858.

History
The probate calendar was created by the Probate Registry, which was responsible for proving wills and administrations from 1858 following enactment of the Court of Probate Act 1857. It replaced a system of ecclesiastical courts. The Principal Probate Registry was established in London in January 1858, along with district probate registries elsewhere in England and Wales.

Content
Information typically included in the calendar is:
Name of the deceased
Date and place of death
Value of the estate
Names of administrators or executors
Date of probate

References

External links 
 Online scans at probatesearch.service.gov.uk

Wills and trusts in the United Kingdom